La Belle Paree was a musical revue that launched the legitimate theatre career of Al Jolson. The book was by Edgar Smith, music by Jerome Kern and Frank Tours and lyrics by Edward Madden. Billee Taylor provided additional music and lyrics, and M. E. Rourke and Frederick Day provided additional lyrics. It premiered on Broadway in 1911.

Production
La Belle Paree was staged between 20 March 1911 and 10 June 1911 at the Winter Garden Theatre in New York, running for 104 performances. At first it was staged along with various companion pieces, including an overture, a one-act opera set in China, called Bow-Sing, an exotic dance sequence called Tortajada and Her Sixteen Moorish Dancing Girls in a Spanish Ballet, and an afterpiece.
After opening night, the show was trimmed and reorganized, and the companion pieces were soon dropped.
The show was produced by Lee Shubert and Jacob J. Shubert, staged by J. C. Huffman and William J. Wilson, and choreographed by Wilson.
The production was briefly revived in September of the same year and then toured from September to November.

Show
The Shubert Brothers engaged Al Jolson for his first Broadway appearance in La Belle Paree, which was the first show to play at their new Winter Garden Theatre.  
The piece concerned Bridgeeta McShane, a wealthy American widow visiting Paris for her health, who meets a number of suitors and eccentric characters, including Erastus Sparkler, played by Jolson. 
Jolson soon converted this supporting role into a star vehicle, and he would make a dozen further Broadway appearances (often at the Winter Garden) in his varied career.

The first performance was overlong and dragged in places, continuing until almost 1:00 am, and some of the audience left before the end. The reviews were mixed, and Jolson was disappointed with his own performance. Jolson was scheduled late in the program, as La Belle Paris followed most of the companion pieces. Jolson played a phony "colored aristocrat", the boyfriend of Bridgeeta's Black maid, played by Mayhew. He wore blackface, and together they sang Jerome Kern's coon song Paris is a Paradise for Coons, about the freedoms African-Americans supposedly enjoyed living in Paris rather than in "Yankee Land".
They also sang another song together, Jolson gave a monologue and sang a third song during the evening.
Many of the critics had already left before Jolson came on, to make their publication deadlines, but the critics that mentioned Jolson and Mayhew, including The New York Times, praised them.

During the second performance, Jolson interrupted the performance to talk to the audience about the poor reviews, and then asked them if they would rather hear him sing. When they agreed, Jolson launched into a series of his own numbers.
This time the reviews were very positive, and the show played for the rest of the season to solid audiences.

Full cast

Featured players were:

 Al Jolson as Erastus Sparkler
 Arthur Cunningham as Bridgeeta McShane
 Barney Bernard as Isadore Cohen
 Bessie Frewen as Margot
 Dorothy Jardon as La Duchesse
 Edgar Atchison-Ely as Henri Dauber
 Florence Tempest as Toots Horner
 Grace Van Studdiford as Mimi
 Grace Washburn as Marcelle
 Harold A. Robe as The Marquis de Champignon
 Harry Fisher as George Ramsbotham
 Hess Sisters as Russian Dancers
 Ida Kramer as A Grisette
 Jean Aylwin as Madame Clarice
 Katherine McDonald as Fifine
 Kitty Gordon as Lady Guff Jordon
 Lee Harrison as Ike Skinheimer
 Lew Quinn as A Cook Guide
 Marion Sunshine as Susie Jenkins
 May Allen as Juliette
 Milberry Rider as A Cocher
 Mitzi Hajos as Fifi Montmartre
 Mlle. Dazie as La Sylphide
 Paul Nicholson as Jack Ralston
 Ray Cox as Susan Brown
 Ray Dodge as Buck Lyons
 Stella Mayhew as Eczema Johnson
 Sylvia Clark as A Flower Girl
 Violet Bowers as Fifine
 Yvette as A Violinist

References
Citations

Sources

  

1911 musicals
Broadway musicals
Vaudeville
Revues